The Liga de Expansión MX, also known as Liga de Desarrollo (Liga BBVA Expansión MX for sponsorship reasons), is a Mexican football league founded in 2020 as part of the Mexican Football Federation's "Stabilization Project", which has the primary objective of rescuing the financially troubled teams from the Ascenso MX and prevent the disappearance of a second-tier league in Mexico, for which there will be no promotion and relegation for six years. The project also attempts for Liga MX and former Ascenso MX teams to consolidate stable projects with strong administration, finances, and infrastructure.

History 
On 20 February 2020, the presidents of the Liga MX clubs, the Ascenso MX clubs and Mexican Football Federation executives had a meeting, in which different topics were discussed with the intent of strengthening the two main leagues in the country.

On 26 June 2020, the league was officially presented, with the participation of 16 teams: Alebrijes de Oaxaca, Atlante, Atlético Morelia, Cancún, Celaya, Cimarrones de Sonora, Correcaminos UAT, Dorados de Sinaloa, Leones Negros UdeG, Mineros de Zacatecas, Tampico Madero, and Venados F.C. as Ascenso MX teams. Pumas Tabasco and Tapatío entered to the league as Liga MX affiliates. Finally, on 17 July 2020, Tepatitlán and Tlaxcala were invited as Liga Premier expansion teams.

Clubs

Champions

Campeón de Campeones

Managers
The current managers in the Liga de Expansión MX are:

Top scorers

References

External links
 Official website

2
Sports leagues established in 2020
2020 establishments in Mexico
Professional sports leagues in Mexico